Bernadette Ngoyisa (born 26 August 1982 in Kinshasa) is a professional women's basketball center with the Indiana Fever of the WNBA. Ngoyisa is from the Democratic Republic of the Congo. She was drafted with the 11th pick in the 2006 WNBA Expansion draft by the Sky from the San Antonio Silver Stars, where she played in 2005. During the 2006 season, Ngoyisa started 23 games and averaged 10.6 points per game and 5.7 rebounds per game.

On May 13, 2008 Ngoyisa was traded to the Indiana Fever.

She started playing for Union Hainaut in France during the 2008-09 WNBA off-season, and did not return to the WNBA afterward.

Notes

External links
 Biography on wnba.com

1982 births
Living people
Basketball players from Kinshasa
Democratic Republic of the Congo expatriate basketball people in France
Democratic Republic of the Congo women's basketball players
Democratic Republic of the Congo expatriates in the United States
Centers (basketball)
Chicago Sky players
Democratic Republic of the Congo expatriate basketball people in the United States
Indiana Fever players
San Antonio Stars players
21st-century Democratic Republic of the Congo people